Kirat Singh Gurjar is an Indian politician and businessman. He is a member of the 18th Legislative Assembly of Uttar Pradesh, representing the Gangoh Assembly constituency of Uttar Pradesh. Kirat is a member of the Bharatiya Janata Party, the largest political party in India.

Early life

Kirat Singh Gurjar was born on 1 March 1967 into the family of Shri Mamchand in Saharanpur, Uttar Pradesh, India. He grew up in Uttar Pradesh and graduated with a Bachelor of Arts from Manav Bharti University, Solan, Himachal Pradesh.

Political career

In the 2022 Uttar Pradesh Legislative Assembly election, Gurjar represented Bharatiya Janata Party as a candidate from the Gangoh Assembly constituency and defeated Inder Sain of the Samajwadi Party by a margin of 23449 votes.

Posts held

See also
 18th Uttar Pradesh Assembly
 Gangoh Assembly constituency
 Uttar Pradesh Legislative Assembly

References 

1967 births
Living people
Indian Hindus
People from Uttar Pradesh
Indian political people
Politicians of Hindu political parties
Bharatiya Janata Party politicians from Uttar Pradesh
Uttar Pradesh MLAs 2022–2027
Indian politicians
People from Saharanpur district